Time in Zambia is given by a single time zone, officially denoted as Central Africa Time (CAT; UTC+02:00). Zambia has never observed daylight saving time. Zambia, as North-Eastern Rhodesia, has observed CAT since 1903.

IANA time zone database 
In the IANA time zone database, Zambia is given one zone in the file zone.tab – Africa/Lusaka. "ZM" refers to the country's ISO 3166-1 alpha-2 country code. Data for Zambia directly from zone.tab of the IANA time zone database; columns marked with * are the columns from zone.tab itself:

See also 
List of time zones by country
List of UTC time offsets

References

External links 
Current time in Zambia at Time.is
Time in Zambia at TimeAndDate.com

Time in Zambia